Peabody Historical Library Museum, also known under the older name of Old Peabody Library, was listed on the National Register of Historic Places (NRHP) in 1973.  It is located in the Downtown Historic District of Peabody, Kansas.  The building has state significance because it was the first free tax-supported library in Kansas.

History

Library
The city of Peabody was named in 1871 after F.H. Peabody, of Boston, formerly vice-president of the Atchison, Topeka and Santa Fe Railway company.  In May 1874, Mr. Peabody visited the new city, at which time he announced he would donate money for a library building, furniture, books, periodicals and landscaping if the Peabody township would secure four lots for the site.  The contract for construction was awarded in early 1875, and the library was opened to the public in June; in February 1876 the state legislature authorized the township to levy a tax to support the library.  The structure housed the library facilities until 1914.

Moved
In 1914, the library was moved, and the Peabody Township Carnegie Library was constructed on the original location.  The building was initially moved to the Peabody City Park, then later it was moved to south of the old Peabody Grade School near the railroad tracks.  It was restored in 1927.  The building was used for club meetings and stood idle for a number of years.

Museum
In 1960, while planning for the 1961 Kansas centennial celebration, local citizens organized to move the structure to a lot near its original location (east of the Carnegie library).  The old library building was converted and dedicated as a museum on July 3, 1961.

Hours

As of 2011, it is open from Memorial Day to Labor Day on the 2nd and 4th Saturday of each month and each federal holiday (Memorial Day, Independence Day, Labor Day).  The hours are 2 pm to 4 pm on each of these days.

Gallery

See also

 List of museums in Kansas
 National Register of Historic Places listings in Marion County, Kansas
 Peabody Downtown Historic District
 Peabody Township Library
 W.H. Morgan House

References
Books

Other

Further reading

External links

Peabody Historical Library Museum (old library)
 
 
Peabody Township Carnegie Library (new library)
 Official Website
 
 
Peabody Downtown Historic District (museum is located in this district)
 
 
Maps
 Peabody City Map, KDOT
 Satellite view of Museum, Google Map

Library buildings completed in 1875
Libraries on the National Register of Historic Places in Kansas
Museums in Marion County, Kansas
History museums in Kansas
Historic district contributing properties in Kansas
National Register of Historic Places in Marion County, Kansas